Pikareinu   is a village in Kanepi Parish, Põlva County in southeastern Estonia.

The second-tallest structure and the highest top in Estonia, Valgjärve TV Mast, is located in Pikareinu village. Poet and writer Elise Aun (1863–1932) was born in Pikareinu.

References

Villages in Põlva County